Meander is a 2020 French science fiction film written and directed by .

Plot

A woman is lying in the middle of the road when a car approaches, before it reaches her she stands and moves aside. The car pulls up beside her and the man inside offers her a lift. They introduce each other as Lisa and Adam. She notices he has a tattoo of a cross on his hand. They speak, and Lisa reveals her daughter Nina had died and today would have been her ninth birthday. After a while, Lisa turns on the radio and hears a report of a man who has murdered two people. The report describes a man with a cross tattoo on his right hand and Lisa realises it is Adam, who slams the brakes throwing Lisa against the dashboard.

Lisa wakes up in a small room with strange lights on the walls and seemingly no way out. She has a strange device attached to her wrist emanating a yellow light. After a while, a door slides open and reveals a narrow tunnel. Lisa crawls into the tunnel and the door closes behind her. The device on her wrist sounds an alarm and a timer briefly flashes showing 11 minutes counting down.

Lisa crawls through the tunnel overcoming various obstacles like an incredibly narrow passage she must squeeze through, a platform that begins to slowly rise and almost crushes her against the ceiling, a rotting body blocking her way that falls apart as she tries to move it.

At one point the tunnel ahead of her is blocked and the device on her wrist glows red and begins to countdown from 60. The walls are suddenly lined with tubes that appears to be heating up, and a section of the wall behind her opens. She quickly scrambles into the space as a glass barrier closes her in and the tunnel behind her is filled with flames.

She carries on through a section that is flooding with water, and an acid pit with only a thin ledge on either side to crawl along and eventually hears a man calling out. She finds herself trapped behind a barrier, the man trapped behind another barrier in front of her, and an open stretch of tunnel between them. The man is clearly losing his mind, his hair is long and he has a beard indicating he has been in this place for a long time. A section of wall opens up in the tunnel between them and fire tubes line the walls, both of their barriers lift at the same time and they race to the safe space. After a struggle, Lisa gains the upper hand and forces the man into the tunnel. The glass barrier drops down severing his arm that was attached to the device. She sees a tattoo of a cross on the hand and realises it was Adam, who is burned alive as the fire fills the tunnel. She then passes out.

She wakes up in the same safe space. A skull, attached to a mechanical tentacle, appears from the ceiling and heals her wounds. It then attaches itself to a part of her suit and Lisa experiences a flashback of Adam attacking her with a knife, her being stabbed and falling from the car, and a strange light in the sky.

She leaves the safe space and takes Adam's arm with her, she examines it and sees there are three markings - a diamond, a cross, and a diamond - underneath the device attached to it. Suddenly, a spinning blade appears in front of her, forcing her to move quickly backwards. She narrowly escapes into a tunnel above.

A section above her opens up, and a strange creature crawls into the tunnel with her and lies still behind her. It begins to chase her and she crawls through a small section of the tunnel that it cannot fit through. It appears to be human but badly burned; its eyes are white and glossed over. It's missing an arm, hinting that it is Adam, reanimated somehow.

She comes to a section with two tunnels to choose from, remembering the markings on Adam's arm she tries to work out which to take. She chooses the left, and hears her daughter Nina's voice. Lisa follows the voice into a bright white room that shows images of her life, from herself as a baby looking up at her father, to seeing her daughter fall to her death from a window.

The burned Adam creature appears above her and descends into the room and gives chase through a tunnel. At the end of the tunnel is bright cloudy sky, but the tunnel itself is lined with razor sharp wire. With no choice but to push forward to escape the creature, Lisa forces her way through the wires, badly injuring herself. Finally, she cannot move just feet from escape. Fire tubes appear from the walls, a safe space opens up which the creature rolls into, and Lisa closes her eyes and waits to die. Just before the flames hit, the floor opens up and she falls to safety.

She wakes up in the same room she started in. Badly injured, she writes the symbols she had seen in blood on the wall for someone else to find after her. The skull appears and begins to heal her but she tells it she wants to die as she wipes the symbols from the wall, it is about to inject - seemingly to euthanise her - when Lisa notices she has only partially wiped the symbols. It was not a two diamonds and a cross, it was 6 arrows indicating directions to take. She tells the skull to stop and, rejuvenated, she sets out again. She easily passes the same obstacles as before, this time knowing how to overcome them.

When she reaches the acid pit, she burns off the clasp of her wrist device and discovers her own set of markings underneath - two crosses and a diamond telling her which directions to take. The creature begins to give chase again as Lisa reaches the split in the tunnel, she throws her removed device down one tunnel to lure the creature and takes the other.

She comes across a strange biological door that leads into a womb like room. She crawls inside and strange creatures - possibly aliens - can be seen moving on the other side of the walls of the womb. She leaves the womb by another exit and enters a similar room, where she notices her wrist device on the floor and the creature stuck in a door ahead of her. She slowly retrieves the device, but it sets off an alarm which rouses the creature and it gives chase again.

They move into a tunnel that again lines the walls with fire tubes. Lisa escapes into the safe room and the glass falls down, but this time the fire doesn't come and the glass opens again and she is pushed back out in to the tunnel with the creature. She wrestles with it, placing her foot on its head as the wall presses them both into the main tunnel. Its head is crushed against the wall, killing it.

Lisa uses the marking on her wrist to find her way. She eventually finds her daughter Nina playing with a ball. She realises her daughter is not real and tells her she has to leave another way. The daughter hugs her, telling her "I'm proud of you, Lisa. We all are", then disappears.

Lisa crawls into one final tunnel with three blades falling at faster intervals. The first is every 4 seconds and she makes it through. The second is every 3, she gets by it. The third is every 2 which seems impossible. Just ahead is the exit with bright blue sky. Determined, she forces herself to try and almost makes it, but her foot is severed in half. She crawls to the exit, weak with loss of blood, and finds it is merely a screen with a video of a sky.

She begins to cry as the tunnel fills with flame tubes.

Suddenly, the ceiling opens up and she begins to float upward into a bright light. She wakes up outside on a rock under a bright blue sky. Her foot is healed. Nina appears before her. Lisa asks her if she has died. Nina tells Lisa that her body died many times, but she is safe now. Lisa asks her what she is supposed to do. Nina says "Live".

The camera pans up, revealing that they are in a beautiful landscape.

Cast
Gaia Weiss as Lisa
Peter Franzén as Adam

Release
The film debuted at the Sitges Film Festival online on 11 October 2020. It was theatrically released first in France on 26 May 2021, and then in United states and on VOD on 9 July 2021 by Gravitas Ventures.

Reception

Box office
Meander grossed a worldwide total of $698,361.

Critical response
Screen Daily compared the film to Cube and noted, "It's in the sound design that the horror really plays out most effectively". Other commentators also noted thematic similarities to Cube. "Hollywood Insider" praised the film writing, "A Tense Sci-Fi Horror Springs Up Like A Trap To Capture And Torture The Imagination". On review aggregator Rotten Tomatoes, the film holds an approval rating of 75% based on 12 reviews, with an average rating of 7/10.

References

External links
 
 

2020 films
French science fiction horror films
2020s science fiction drama films
2020s French films